Hydrochoreutes is a genus of mites belonging to the family Pionidae.

Species:
 Hydrochoreutes intermedius Cook, 1956
 Hydrochoreutes michiganensis Cook
 Hydrochoreutes microporus Cook
 Hydrochoreutes schizopetiolatus Cook
 Hydrochoreutes ungulatus (Koch, 1836)

References

Trombidiformes
Trombidiformes genera